Mansakenning is a historic home located at Rhinebeck, Dutchess County, New York. It was built about 1903 and is a Georgian-inspired manor house.  It is a rectangular, two to three story stone dwelling with a hipped roof and built into a hillside.  The five bay wide building features a hipped roof entrance porch supported by paired Doric order columns.  Also on the property are a contributing barn, carriage house, two sheds, and a guest cottage.

It was added to the National Register of Historic Places in 1987.

References

Houses on the National Register of Historic Places in New York (state)
Houses completed in 1903
Houses in Rhinebeck, New York
National Register of Historic Places in Dutchess County, New York